Andriy Mishchenko (born 7 April 1991) is a professional Ukrainian football defender who plays for Neftchi Fergana.

Career
He is a product of Youth Sportive School Molod' Poltava.

In March 2014, he signed a contract with the Ukrainian Premier League club Sevastopol.

On 20 February 2020, FC Okzhetpes announced the signing of Mishchenko. On 27 July 2020, Mishchenko left Okzhetpes by mutual consent.

In March 2021, Mishchenko joined FC Istiklol on trial, signing a one-year contract with the club on 29 March 2021.

Career statistics

Club

Honors
Istiklol
 Tajik Supercup (1): 2021
 Tajikistan Higher League (1): 2021

References

External links

1991 births
Living people
Ukrainian footballers
FC Hirnyk-Sport Horishni Plavni players
FC Stal Alchevsk players
FC Sevastopol players
FC Olimpik Donetsk players
Maccabi Netanya F.C. players
Hapoel Ashkelon F.C. players
FC Chornomorets Odesa players
FC SKA-Khabarovsk players
FC Okzhetpes players
FC Istiklol players
Association football defenders
Ukrainian Premier League players
Israeli Premier League players
Kazakhstan Premier League players
Ukrainian expatriate footballers
Expatriate footballers in Israel
Expatriate footballers in Russia
Expatriate footballers in Kazakhstan
Expatriate footballers in Uzbekistan
Ukrainian expatriate sportspeople in Israel
Ukrainian expatriate sportspeople in Russia
Ukrainian expatriate sportspeople in Kazakhstan
Ukrainian expatriate sportspeople in Uzbekistan
Sportspeople from Poltava Oblast